Burnley Football Club, an English association football club based in Burnley, Lancashire, was founded on 18 May 1882 as Burnley Rovers. The suffix "Rovers" was soon dropped, and the club was simply known as "Burnley Football Club" at the time of its first recorded match on 10 August 1882. For the first six years of its existence, there was no league football, so matches were arranged on an ad hoc basis, supplemented by cup competitions organised at local and national level. The club won its first trophy in 1883: the Dr Dean's Cup, a knockout competition between amateur clubs in the local area. Burnley turned professional at the end of 1883, first entered the FA Cup in the 1885–86 season, and were one of the 12 founding members of the Football League in 1888. The team have played in the top four tiers of English football from 1888 to the present day.

Burnley have been champions of England twice, in 1920–21 and 1959–60, have won the FA Cup once, in 1913–14, and have won the FA Charity Shield twice, in 1960 and 1973. They have been runners-up in the First Division twice, in 1919–20 and 1961–62, and FA Cup runners-up twice, in 1946–47 and 1961–62. Burnley were the second, and are one of only five teams to have won all four professional divisions of English football, along with Wolverhampton Wanderers, Preston North End, Sheffield United and Portsmouth.

As of the end of the 2021–22 season, the team have spent 59 seasons in the top division of English football, 46 in the second, 11 in the third, and 7 in the fourth. The table details their achievements in domestic and international competitions, and records their top goalscorer and average home league attendance, for each completed season.

Key

Key to league record:
Pld – Matches played
W – Matches won
D – Matches drawn
L – Matches lost
GF – Goals for
GA – Goals against
Pts – Points
Pos – Final position

Key to colours and symbols:

Key to divisions:
FL – Football League
Div 1 – Football League First Division
Div 2 – Football League Second Division
Div 3 – Football League Third Division
Div 4 – Football League Fourth Division
Prem – Premier League
Champ – EFL Championship

Key to rounds:
DNE – Did not enter
QR4 – Fourth qualifying round
IntR – Intermediate round (between qualifying rounds and rounds proper)
PO – Play-off round
Group – Group stage
Group(N) – Group stage Northern section
R1 – First round, etc.
R1(N) – First round Northern section, etc.
QF – Quarter-final
QF(N) – Quarter-final Northern section
SF – Semi-final
SF(N) – Semi-final Northern section
P3rd – Third place
F – Finalists
F(N) – Finalists Northern section
W – Winners

Details of the abandoned 1939–40 Football League are shown in italics and appropriately footnoted.

Seasons

Notes

References 
Specific

General
 

 
Burnley